Scoparia uncinata is a moth in the family Crambidae. It was described by Wei-Chun Li, Hou-Hun Li and Matthias Nuss in 2010. It is found in the Chinese provinces of Gansu, Hubei, Shaanxi and Sichuan.

The length of the forewings is 7–8 mm. The forewings are covered with blackish-brown scales. The antemedian and postmedian lines are white. The hindwings are also white.

Etymology
The species name refers to the cornutus ending with a unique hook in the male genitalia and is derived from Latin uncinatus (meaning hooked).

References

Moths described in 2010
Scorparia